Mordellistena fernandezi is a beetle in the genus Mordellistena of the family Mordellidae. It was described in 1976 by Palm.

References

fernandezi
Beetles described in 1976